Leon Burton Rideout (April 8, 1920 – 1987) was a Canadian politician. He served in the Legislative Assembly of New Brunswick as member of the Progressive Conservative party.

References

1920 births
1987 deaths